Minnie Buckingham Harper (May 15, 1886 – February 10, 1978) was an American politician and housewife.

Born in Winfield, West Virginia, Harper was a resident of Keystone when she became in 1928 the first black woman legislator in the United States. She was appointed by Governor Howard M. Gore to the West Virginia House of Delegates to fill the vacancy left by the death of her husband Ebenezer Howard Harper. The McDowell County Republican Executive Committee unanimously recommended that Harper fill her husband's position.

She did not seek reelection at the end of her term.

References

External links 
 

1886 births
1978 deaths
People from Putnam County, West Virginia
Republican Party members of the West Virginia House of Delegates
African-American state legislators in West Virginia
African-American women in politics
Women state legislators in West Virginia
People from Keystone, West Virginia
20th-century American politicians
20th-century American women politicians
20th-century African-American women
20th-century African-American politicians